Tectoporus is a genus of millipedes belonging to the family Paradoxosomatidae.

The species of this genus are found in Southeastern Asia.

Species

Species:

Tectoporus aberrans 
Tectoporus ambiguus 
Tectoporus annex

References

Paradoxosomatidae